The Babi dynasty was a Afghan dynasty that formed the ruling royal houses of British India's princely states. The Babai community, originally of Afghan descent, largely resides in India and some parts of Pakistan. The community traces its royal origins to the dynasty founded by Sherkhanji Babi in 1654, who was himself a ruler from the dynasty's founding until 1690. The last Nawab of the British Indian princely state of Junagadh, Sir Muhammad Khanji, signed an Instrument of Accession and acceded his princely state of Junagadh, as well as its vassal state of Bantva Manavadar, to the Dominion of Pakistan after the Partition of British India in 1947. However, the Dominion of India did not recognize the accession and annexed the princely state shortly afterwards.

History

The Babi Tribe is a pashtun tribe which originates from eastern Afghanistan and western regions of Pakistan. Babi or Babai (Pashtun tribe) is son of Ghorghasht or Gharghashti. The first Babi is said to have entered Gujarat with Humayun. They claim to have come to India from Khorasan under the leadership of Usman Khan, a follower of Mughal emperor Humayun. Bahadur Khanji Babi, son of Usman Khan, migrated to India and entered service under the Mughals. The hereditary title (Tribe) of Babi was conferred to him in 1554 from Emperor Humayun, for "services against the Rana of Chittor". 

Sherkhanji Babi, founder of the Babi dynasty in 1654 joined the service of Prince Murad Baksh in Kathiawar, the Imperial Viceroy and son of Shah Jahan. In Mughal sources, the members of the Babi tribe are recognized as "Gujaratis", due to their regional "Gujarati" identity, intermarriage and assimilation to its culture, and reference to their clan was mainly mentioned as a community within the different Gujarati subgroups, for example Shujaat Khan Gujarati of Ahmedabad. Aurangzeb also writes in the Ruqa'at-i Alamgiri: "The 'Faujdarship' should be given to one of the Gujaratis: Safdar Khan-i Sani", referring to Safdar Khan of the Babi tribe. They largely identified with those who had lived for generations in the country or were converts.

After the collapse of the Mughal Empire, the Babis were involved in a struggle with the Gaekwad dynasty of the Maratha Empire for control of Gujarat. While the Marathas were successful in establishing control over all of Gujarat, the Babis retained sovereignty of the princely states of Junagadh, Radhanpur, Balasinor,  Manavadar, Bantva, Pajod and Sardargadh.

Members of this dynasty ruled over the princely states of Junagadh, Radhanpur and Balasinor, as well as the small states of Bantva Manavadar, Pajod and Sardargarh.

Members of the Babi tribe are found throughout north Gujarat and Saurashtra. Iconic Bollywood actress Parveen Babi was of Babi lineage, but most contemporary Babis, barring those belonging to princely lineages, are in modest circumstances. Many are petty landowners, but there is marked urbanization among the Babi as well. Though the Babis observe a tradition of endogamy, there are cases of marriages with the Chauhan and Behlim communities, and they accept daughters from the Shaikhs and Sunni Bohras.

Notable people
Parveen Babi, Indian film actress.
Muhammad Dilawar Khanji: 14th Governor of Sindh, Pakistan.
 Muhammad Jehangir Khanji: Advisor to Chief Minister, Sindh.
Ruswa Majhalumi, Gujarati Ghazal poet
Ghulam Moinuddin Khanji of Bantva-Manavadar- India Capt Cricket, Hockey; President, Pakistan sports assn.
Sarwat Gilani Pakistani Actress.

See also
 Pathans of Gujarat
List of Sunni dynasties
 Nawab of Junagadh
 Annexation of Junagadh
 Babai (Pashtun tribe)
 List of Pashtun empires and dynasties
 Bantva-Manavadar

References 

History of Pakistan
Junagadh district
History of Gujarat
Indian royalty
Pashtun dynasties
Sunni dynasties